Silvano Canzoneri (4 February 1941 in Corleone – 5 October 1995 in Venice) was an Italian entomologist.

Canzoneri specialized in Coleoptera, especially Tenebrionidae, Diptera and Ephydridae.

References
Coleoptera org In Italian includes full bibliography and list of taxa described by him.

1941 births
1995 deaths
Italian entomologists
People from Corleone
20th-century Italian zoologists
Scientists from Sicily